Sabata the Killer is a 1970 Argentine comedy western film directed by Tulio Demicheli, written by Nino Stresa, scored by Marcello Giombini, and starring Anthony Steffen, Peter Lee Lawrence and Eduardo Fajardo. It is an unofficial sequel spin-off of Sabata.

Cast

References

External links
 

1970 comedy films
1970 films
1970s Western (genre) comedy films
Argentine Western (genre) comedy films
Films directed by Tulio Demicheli
Films scored by Marcello Giombini
Films shot in Rome
20th Century Fox films